was a system used to record information regarding aliens resident in Japan. It was handled at the municipal level, parallel to (but separately from) the koseki (family register) and juminhyo (resident register) systems used to record information regarding Japanese nationals.

Foreigners staying in Japan for more than 90 days (excluding military personnel under a status of forces agreement and diplomatic personnel) were required to register within 90 days of landing in Japan. The applicant was required to provide a completed application form, passport (for applicants 16 years old or older) and two identification photos. The system was voluntary for shorter-term visitors.

Alien registration was a prerequisite to many activities in Japan, such as purchasing a mobile phone, opening a bank account or obtaining a driver's license.

As described below, the alien registration system was replaced with a foreign residents' registration system on July 9, 2012. The new system of foreign resident registration was passed from the local municipal level to the national level.

Registered information 
The information stored in the alien registration system included:

 Date of registration
 Name (including any legal alias)
 Date of birth
 Gender
 Nationality and place of residence in home country
 Place of birth
 Employer/school, work/school address and occupation (if any)
 Passport number and date of issuance
 Date of landing in Japan
 Status of residence and duration of stay
 Residential address
 Information regarding household members (including name, date of birth, nationality and relationship)
 Information regarding parent(s) and/or spouse residing in Japan.

Any changes in registered information had to be reported to the municipal office.

If a resident alien moved within Japan, they were required to report their move to the new municipality of residence, which then took possession of the tōroku genpyō. The tōroku genpyō was closed when the alien left Japan without a re-entry permit, and was then kept in an archive at the Ministry of Justice. Any subsequent entry to Japan by the same person required a new registration which was kept on a new tōroku genpyō.

Alien registration card 
All aliens in Japan were required to carry their passport or ARC at all times. The issuance of an ARC generally took about two weeks from the filing of the application.

Because this form of certificate did not contain the subject's photograph, it was not as widely accepted as the ARC for identity verification purposes, and was mainly used as a temporary certificate when an ARC was unavailable.

The ARC had to be surrendered when the foreigner left Japan unless they had a valid re-entry permit in their passport.

Legal alias 
This resembles the 通称 that Japanese are allowed to use — for example, to continue using a maiden name at work and on bank accounts after marriage. Foreigners who are long-term residents of Japan, particularly ethnic Koreans whose families have lived in Japan for generations, often adopt Japanese names as aliases in order to integrate within society. Ethnic Japanese who live in Japan as resident aliens may use a legal alias to reflect their ancestral name. Legal aliases are also used when registering a seal in a different script than the applicant's legal name (e.g., in katakana rather than Latin script).

A person is generally required to use their alias in public relations before registering it. The exact criteria vary by locality, but the most common evidence is mail addressed to the alias name. One common technique which applicants use to create this evidence is to label the post box at their registered residence using the alias, and then mail themselves a postcard or letter addressed to the alias. One may also pay one's NHK television fee under the alias, and then receive official bills using that alias.

Aliases may be registered upon initial alien registration. If the alias is registered subsequently, upon registration of the alias, the registrant receives a handwritten notation indicating the legal alias on the reverse side of their alien registration card. Any registration certificate which is subsequently issued will show the alias in type in parentheses just below the holder's name.

A registered alias may be used on credit cards, health insurance, bank accounts and other documents. However, such documents may cause difficulties in foreign countries where the holder does not have personal identification showing their Japanese alias; thus documents in the registrant's foreign name may be preferable in non-Japanese speaking locales. Foreigners may obtain a Japanese credit card with a photo.

Japanese nationals often use aliases for non-official purposes. For example, women often continue to use their maiden names following marriage, even though they are required to adopt the same family name as their husband for their legal name. However, Japanese nationals are not permitted to use an alias for legal purposes: their name on any official document (e.g. domestic use Japanese identification) must match the name appearing in their family register and resident register. Japanese passports may contain alternate names in parentheses next to the family name or the given name if the Japanese can show a legal connection and use of these names overseas. Multiple alternate names are separated by slashes. Non-standard non-Hepburn romanization may also be used for the main names if one can show a legal connection using these spellings.

Issues

Fingerprinting debate 
From 1952 onward, alien registration required the applicant to provide fingerprints from all fingers. Resident Koreans and other groups opposed this provision as a human rights violation. Kathleen Morikawa saw fingerprinting as violating the Golden Rule and fought for a level playing field. The fingerprinting system was repealed for Special Permanent Residents in the 1980s and for other aliens in 1999.

The fingerprint law was described in an Office of the United Nations High Commissioner for Human Rights report, Prevention of Discrimination: The Rights of Non-Citizens (final report of the special rapporteur David Weissbrodt), as follows:

The Japanese government has since introduced fingerprinting and photographing of foreigners, claiming that this is a terrorism control measure. Fingerprinting is conducted at the immigration checkpoint when entering Japan and is only conducted using the two index fingers. Japanese nationals and Special Permanent Residents are exempt from the procedure; long-term residency holders are requested to give fingerprint scans regardless.

When enforced, 95 people out of 700,000 who had entered Japan in one month were refused entry.

Relation with other registration systems 
The alien registration system was similar to, but completely separate from, the koseki system used to record Japanese families and the juminhyo system used to record individual residents. If a household contained any non-Japanese members, those people would not appear in the koseki or juminhyo alongside the Japanese members. However, both Japanese and non-Japanese members of a registered alien's family appear in the alien's registration certificate; therefore one alien registration certificate can be used to prove their familial relationship.

One side effect of this situation was that it was impossible for an alien married to a Japanese national to be registered as the head of their household on a koseki or juminhyo.

Foreign residents' registration system
The Japanese government passed a law replacing the alien registration system with a residents' registration system. This new system started from July 9, 2012. The changes see non-Japanese residents recorded alongside Japanese residents in the jūminhyō system. (Note the distinction between the koseki system, which has not changed, and the jūminhyō).

Local city officials stopped issuing Alien Registration Cards and all foreigners are now issued Residence Cards by immigration authorities. Use of the old card was permitted until 8 July 2015, or when the resident's current status expired, whichever came first.

Residency status renewals are automatically reported to City Offices. Immigration Dept. penalties for failing to promptly report changes in address to the City Office may be quite severe. As was the case for Alien Registration, penalties for not carrying registration cards at all times are still likely to be heavy.

Special Permanent Residents such as special Korean residents of Japan have a Special Permanent Resident Certificate instead of a Residence Card.

References

External links 
 Guide for Foreign Residents in Japan (not yet updated for new system)

 Registration of a Japanese name alias explained in Japanese by Nishio City, Aichi Prefecture
 About.com article in Japanese on aliases (17 Oct 2006) 

Identity documents
Immigration to Japan
Law of Japan
Public records